This was the first edition of the tournament.

Natela Dzalamidze and Kamilla Rakhimova won the title, defeating Misaki Doi and Oksana Kalashnikova in the final, 6–2, 7–5.

Seeds

Draw

Draw

References

Main Draw

External Links

2022 Open de Rouen